The Collection is the second compilation album by English girl group Atomic Kitten. It was released by EMI Records on 2 May 2005 to coincide with the group's temporary reunion on their single "Cradle." The album consists of singles, B-sides and tracks from their first three albums Right Now (2000), Feels So Good (2002), and Ladies Night (2003). While it failed to chart, The Collection was certified Silver by the British Phonographic Industry (BPI) in July 2013. Although she does not appear on the album cover and is not credited, Kerry Katona's vocals do appear on the album.

Track listing

Notes
 denotes co-producer
 denotes additional producer

Certifications

Release history

References

2005 greatest hits albums
Atomic Kitten albums